Benny Lohse (24 March 1935 – 8 November 2004) was a Danish footballer. He played in six matches for the Denmark national football team from 1958 to 1962.

References

External links
 

1935 births
2004 deaths
Danish men's footballers
Denmark international footballers
Place of birth missing
Association footballers not categorized by position